The Mexican Secretary of Tourism (SECTUR) is the government department in charge of the nation's tourism promotion and development. The Secretary is appointed by the President of the Republic and is  a member of the federal executive cabinet.

The department conducts the development policy for national tourist activity and promotes tourist development zones in conjunction with the states.

List of secretaries 
 President Luis Echeverría
 (1975–1976)  : Julio Hirschfeld Almada
 President José López Portillo
 (1976–1980) : Guillermo Rossell de la Lama
 (1980–1982) : Rosa Luz Alegría Escamilla
 President Miguel de la Madrid
 (1982–1988) : Antonio Enríquez Savignac
 President Carlos Salinas de Gortari
 (1988–1990) : Carlos Hank González
 (1990–1993) : Pedro Joaquín Coldwell
 (1993–1994) : Jesús Silva Herzog Flores
 President Ernesto Zedillo
 (1994–1997) : Silvia Hernández Enríquez
 (1997–2000)  : Óscar Espinosa Villarreal
 President Vicente Fox
 (2000–2003) : Leticia Navarro
 (2003–2006) : Rodolfo Elizondo Torres
 President Felipe Calderón
 (2006–2010) : Rodolfo Elizondo Torres
 (2010–2012)  : Gloria Guevara Manzo
 President Enrique Peña Nieto
 (2012–2015)  : Claudia Ruiz Massieu
 (2015–2018) : Enrique de la Madrid Cordero
 President Andrés Manuel López Obrador
 (2018–present) : Miguel Torruco Marqués

See also

Government of Mexico

References

External links 
Official Website of Tourism
Official site of the President's Cabinet

Tourism
Mexico
Tourism